Cynthia Mulligan (born in Montreal, Quebec) is a Canadian television presenter on CITY-TV's CityNews.

Mulligan studied English at McMaster University in Hamilton, Ontario.
She started at Citytv in the CityPulse library.  Before moving over to CityNews, she was a news writer for Breakfast Television.  Mulligan has also been an ENG cameraperson and a videographer.  She added the duties of anchoring CP24 in January 1998 until 2008 when CTVglobemedia acquired the channel.

Mulligan currently works as a reporter on CityNews at Five and CityNews at Six (weekdays) focusing on politics. She used to be an education specialist/reporter in the 2008-2010 period.  Her work has been nominated for a Gemini Award for best local reporting. She has won two Radio Television Digital News Association (RTDNA) awards: her first was for her coverage of the 2015 terrorist attacks in Paris; her second was in 2017 for her series on Transgender Surgery in Bangkok. She also won The Edward R Murrow award for her 2010-2011 series "Kicking Cancer" which dealt with her battle with breast cancer. 

Mulligan has two daughters. In April 2010, she was diagnosed with breast cancer.  She announced the diagnosis publicly in May 2010, and has since reported on and blogged about her experiences of treatment.  In 2018, she made an impact statement in court against ex-boyfriend Mike Bullard after he pled guilty to making harassing phone calls.

On 29 June 2021, Mulligan took to Twitter to announce that her cancer had returned. She was diagnosed with Stage 4 breast cancer around Christmas, 2020.

References

Canadian television reporters and correspondents
Year of birth missing (living people)
Living people
Canadian women television journalists
Journalists from Montreal
Citytv people